Weber is an unincorporated community in Lewis County, in the U.S. state of Missouri.

History
A post office called Weber was established in 1882, and remained in operation until 1907. The community was named after William Weber, a local merchant.

References

Unincorporated communities in Lewis County, Missouri
Unincorporated communities in Missouri